Shambhu Sharan Patel is an Indian politician who is serving as a Member of the Rajya Sabha from Bihar since May 29, 2022 representing the Bharatiya Janata Party. He belongs to Sheikhpura district of Bihar.

Personal life 
Shambhu Sharan Patel was born in Sheikhpura district of Bihar. He belongs to the Kurmi caste.

References 

Living people
Rajya Sabha members from the Bharatiya Janata Party
People from Sheikhpura district
Rajya Sabha members from Bihar
Year of birth missing (living people)
Bharatiya Janata Party politicians from Bihar